Richard John Spare (born 1951) is a British artist known primarily for his drypoints, etchings and oil paintings. He is based in London.

Background
Spare attended Maidstone College of Art (1971–74) (now the University for the Creative Arts) where he studied painting under Fred Cuming. On leaving art college, Spare honed his technical skills as a printmaker at Thomas Ross & Son of Putney (1974–77), where he was involved in printing George Stubbs prints, which were sold through the Tate Gallery, and the renovation of fine Turner aquatint plates, which were exhibited at the Royal Academy of Arts Turner Bi-centenary Exhibition. Spare also printed original plates from masters including Hogarth, Cruikshank, Rowlandson, Gillray, Landseer and mezzotints by Martin.

A Master Printmaker, Spare has editioned work for many contemporary artists, including David Hockney, Robert Ryman, Francesco Clemente, Donald Sultan, Jim Dine and Keith Haring. In 1977 he worked with David Hockney as his assistant, setting up an etching studio for him and printing five editions from Hockney's The Blue Guitar suite. Being able to watch Hockney at work on his sets for the Glyndebourne Magic Flute developed Spare's technical interests and appreciation of simple form.

In 1979 Spare participated in the printing of William Daniell's A Voyage Round Great Britain, topographical views of Great Britain, for the Tate Gallery. A posthumous edition of Ceri Richards' images followed 1979–81; sold in conjunction with the exhibition of his work at the Tate Gallery in 1981.

In the early eighties, Spare was involved in printing the 'Banks' Florilegium' (Egerton-Williams Studio), the largest restorative printmaking project of the twentieth century. The plates for the 743 engravings of plants, from watercolours by Sydney Parkinson were made during the first voyage of James Cook to Australia. Having been stored in the British Museum for 200 years, wrapped in a paper containing acid, they had become corroded. Meticulous restoration and demanding à la poupée printing ended with the Museum's Botanical Editor checking them for botanical correctness before they could be published.

In 1988 Spare worked in New York with Jasper Johns, proofing and editioning complex carborundum prints.

In 1989 the entirety of Keith Harring and William S. Burroughs' project 'The Valley' was printed by Spare in London. Published in 1990.

Independent work
Since the late 1980s Spare has concentrated solely on his own work, which derives from nature and travel. To date he has published more than 400 images. His characteristic hand printed and watercoloured original drypoints are admired for their pared down, and unique, view of the world – 'the joy of being'. Colour is a crucial element to Spare's work, each being selected to 'vibrate with the velvet black of the drypoint line'. Spare's Wellington Studio garden in Charlton was designed as a rich source of inspiration. Focusing on wildlife it is a 'small haven' for the subjects of many of his works. Wellington studio is a 'homage' to the art of printmaking, with five restored antique etching presses, housed in a converted Victorian coach house.

Selected exhibitions
A frequent exhibitor at the Royal Academy Summer Exhibition, Spare has exhibited 43 individual works there from 29 years as of the 2022 Academy Summer Show; his work was first accepted in 1973.

Spare has twice been an invited exhibitor at The Discerning Eye exhibition at the Mall Galleries.

Spare also regularly exhibits his work internationally:
One-man international shows include a series of annual exhibitions in cities throughout Japan, including Tokyo, Fukuoka, Osaka, Yokohama, Hiroshima, Matsuyama, Sendai, Sapporo, Kobe, Kyoto, Nagoya, Kagoshima, Kawagoe, and Nara, which spanned 11 years. More recently, he has had one-man shows in Ballarat and Daylesford, Victoria, Australia. He was Guest International Artist at the Toorak Village Art Affair, Melbourne 2012.

Solo exhibitions in the UK include The Craft Centre & Design Gallery, Leeds City Art Gallery, Trevelyan College, University of Durham, Cambridge Gallery.

Notable mixed shows include 'The Art on paper Fair' at the Royal College of Art, The Royal Society of Painter-Etchers and Engravers open exhibitions, 'The Originals', Society of Wildlife Artists and the Royal Society of British Artists Open exhibitions at the Mall Galleries, the Folkestone Metropole Galleries and the Whitechapel Open Exhibitions.

Collections
Richard Spare's work appears in numerous public and private collections worldwide, including:

 Victoria & Albert Museum, London
 British Library, London
 Leeds Art Gallery
 Berlin Central and Regional Library
 Federation University Australia, Victoria
 Chelmsford Museum
 Maidstone Museum & Art Gallery
 Aston University, Birmingham
 University of Durham

Publications
Cover illustration ('Snowdrop') for poetry publication: Iron String, A. Lighthart, Airlie Press, Oregon, USA. 1 October 2013. 
'Rowing Boat I' reproduced to exemplify a drypoint in Etching – a guide to traditional techniques, A. Smith, The Crowood Press, 2004. 
Galerie d'Amour, J. Powls, Poetry@MMD, 1998.  Illustrated by Richard Spare and Kay Spare.
Richard Spare – Printmaker, Beatrice Royal Contemporary Art & Craft, The Beatrice Royal Art Gallery, Tramman Trust, 2000.

References

In a Chiaroscuro, from: The Blue Guitar (Scottish Arts Council 204; Tokyo 186)
Butlin, M., Gage, J., Joll, E. and Wilton, A., Turner 1775–1851: Bicentenary Exhibition Catalogue (London: Tate, 1974)
The Endeavour Botanical Illustrations
Judith A. Diment, Christopher J. Humphries, Linda Newington & Elaine Shaughnessy. Catalogue of the natural history drawings commissioned by Joseph Banks on the Endeavour voyage 1768–1771 held in the British Museum (Natural History), Part I: Botany: Australia (Bulletin of the British Museum (Natural History), Historical Series Volume 11), London, 1984.
Judith A. Diment, Christopher J. Humphries, Linda Newington & Elaine Shaughnessy. Catalogue of the natural history drawings commissioned by Joseph Banks on the Endeavour voyage 1768–1771 held in the British Museum (Natural History), Part 2: Botany: Brazil, Java, Madeira, New Zealand, Society Islands and Tierra del Fuego (Bulletin of the British Museum (Natural History), Historical Series Volume 12), London, 1987.
Ceri Richards (exh. cat., London, Tate, 1981)
The Valley, Keith Haring and William Burroughs, George Mulder Fine Arts, New York City

External links 
 
 Richard Spare's artwork on WikiArt
 Richard Spare's catalogue at the Bridgeman Art Library
 Richard Spare's biography on Europeana
 Richard Spare's biography at the Royal Academy of Arts
 Richard Spare represented in the Berlin Central and Regional Library (ZLB)
 Richard Spare represented in the Federation University Australia Art Collection
 Richard Spare's biography on Prints and printmaking Australia Asia Pacific
 David Hockney's The old guitarist, editioned by Richard Spare, National Gallery Australia

Living people
1951 births
Alumni of the University for the Creative Arts
English contemporary artists
English printmakers
20th-century British printmakers
21st-century British printmakers
English engravers
English etchers
20th-century English painters
21st-century English painters
English male painters
Painters from London
Artists from London
People from Chelmsford
20th-century English male artists
21st-century English male artists
20th-century engravers